Philippe Nauche (born July 15, 1957) was a member of the National Assembly of France. He represented Corrèze's 2nd Constituency for two separate periods.  From 1997 to 2002 and again from 2007 to 2017, as a member of the Socialiste, radical, citoyen et divers gauche.

He lost his seat in the 2017 election.

References

1957 births
Living people
People from Brive-la-Gaillarde
Socialist Party (France) politicians
Deputies of the 13th National Assembly of the French Fifth Republic
Deputies of the 14th National Assembly of the French Fifth Republic
Deputies of the 11th National Assembly of the French Fifth Republic